Holly Barratt (born 1 January 1988) is an Australian swimmer. She competed in the women's 50 metre backstroke event at the 2017 World Aquatics Championships.

References

External links
 

1988 births
Living people
Australian female butterfly swimmers
Australian female freestyle swimmers
Commonwealth Games medallists in swimming
Commonwealth Games silver medallists for Australia
Place of birth missing (living people)
Swimmers at the 2018 Commonwealth Games
Swimmers at the 2022 Commonwealth Games
World Aquatics Championships medalists in swimming
Universiade medalists in swimming
Universiade gold medalists for Australia
Universiade bronze medalists for Australia
Medalists at the 2015 Summer Universiade
Australian female backstroke swimmers
21st-century Australian women
Medallists at the 2018 Commonwealth Games
Medallists at the 2022 Commonwealth Games